Louisiana Highway 1 (LA 1) is a state highway in Louisiana.  At , it is the longest numbered highway of any class in Louisiana.  It runs diagonally across the state, connecting the oil and gas fields near the island of Grand Isle with the northwest corner of the state, north of Shreveport.

The part south of U.S. Highway 90 near Raceland is Corridor 44, a National Highway System High Priority Corridor. From Alexandria to Shreveport, the LA 1 corridor was used for Interstate 49.

Between New Roads, Louisiana, and the interchange with Interstate 49 at Alexandria, Louisiana, LA 1 forms part of the Zachary Taylor Parkway.

Route description
The southern terminus of LA 1 is at a dead end in Grand Isle on the south bank of Bayou Rigaud. It heads southwest and west through Grand Isle, turning northwest where it meets LA 3090 (the road to Port Fourchon). At Leeville the road crosses Bayou Lafourche on the Leeville Bridge and begins to parallel the bayou on its west bank, heading through towns such as Golden Meadow, Larose, Lockport, Raceland, Thibodaux, Napoleonville and  Paincourtville. At Donaldsonville, where the bayou meets the Mississippi River, LA 1 turns northwest to parallel the river. (Southeast of Donaldsonville, LA 18 and LA 3089/LA 3127 parallel the Mississippi.)

From Donaldsonville to Port Allen, across the Mississippi from Baton Rouge, LA 1 generally parallels the Mississippi River. It takes a relatively straight inland route, bypassing the curves of the river followed by LA 405 and LA 988. At Port Allen, it meets U.S. Highway 190 at the west end of the Huey P. Long Bridge, and turns west with US 190 to past Erwinville. There it turns back north, running along several back channels and oxbows of the Mississippi to New Roads (which is bypassed by LA 3131), and then heading west from New Roads to Morganza with LA 10 (still paralleling the Mississippi). From Morganza to Lettsworth, LA 1 heads northwest near the Mississippi; LA 15 begins in Lettsworth and continues north along the river while LA 1 continues generally northwest towards Alexandria.

LA 1 heads inland through such towns as Simmesport, Moreauville, and Marksville to Alexandria, where it meets the Pineville Expressway (U.S. Highway 165/LA 28). LA 1 turns southwest along its frontage roads - Fulton Street and Casson Street - along with LA 28 Business and U.S. Highway 167 Business to its end at Interstate 49, and continues southwest on Mason Street and northwest on Bolton Avenue.

From Alexandria to Shreveport, LA 1 generally parallels Interstate 49, including a bypass around Natchitoches. Louisiana Highway 1 Business runs through downtown Natchitoches before rejoining the original highway just northwest of the city limits. It passes through Shreveport on Youree Drive, Spring Street and Market Street, running concurrently with U.S. Highway 71 from Interstate 20 downtown to a split north of downtown. From Shreveport to the border with Texas, where LA 1 becomes State Highway 77, LA 1 passes through towns such as Oil City, Vivian and Rodessa.

History
As the successor to the Jefferson Highway, LA 1 started a little further south than the Jefferson Highway, but was the same route, more or less. LA 1 began in Pointe-a-la-Hache, continuing north through small communities, making its way to New Orleans. The route description from New Orleans north is as follows:

From the southern terminus at Common Street, LA 1 followed St. Charles Avenue, Canal Street, City Park Avenue, and Metairie Road into Jefferson Parish. Leaving New Orleans, LA 1 followed Metairie Road, Shrewsbury Road, and Jefferson Highway to Kenner.

From Kenner to Geismar, LA 1 followed alongside the east bank levee of the Mississippi River which, due to various sections of levee being relocated during the 1920s and 1930s, is often a significant distance removed from the modern River Road. Also, a two-mile section between Norco and Montz was eliminated in 1935 when the parallel Airline Highway bridge across the Bonnet Carré Spillway was opened. Portions of LA 1 at Reserve and Gramercy are still known as Jefferson Highway to this day.

From Geismar to Baton Rouge, the route followed what is known as Old Jefferson Highway to downtown Baton Rouge. The original routing through downtown Baton Rouge followed Claycut Road, South Acadian Thruway, Government Street, 19th Street, and North Street to the former Mississippi River ferry landing to Port Allen.

From Port Allen to Alexandria, LA 1 used Court Street, North Jefferson Avenue, and Rosedale Road through Port Allen, then along Rosedale Road to Rosedale, Ravenswood, and then to Red Cross. LA 1 crossed the Atchafalaya River by ferry to Melville and continued on to Lebeau. It used the current route of US 71 to Bunkie, with a short section over a one-lane truss bridge that was bypassed in the mid-1930s. North of Cheneyville, it used US 71 and parts of some bypassed roads to Chambers, then Old Baton Rouge Highway to Alexandria.

In Alexandria and Pineville, LA 1 used Jefferson Hwy., Lee Street, Main Street, and Murray Street through Alexandria, then LA 1 crossed the Red River on a now-demolished bridge at the foot of Murray Street into Pineville, then Main Street and Military Highway, Jefferson Highway, and US 71 (Shreveport Highway) through Pineville.

North of Pineville, LA 1 used US 71 and Shreveport Highway. (Stainaker Street is a small, severed portion of the original route near the junction of US 71 and LA 3225.) Numerous curves were straightened along the route, including a bypassed route through Colfax. North of Colfax, LA 1 followed US 71 north to Clarence, then over on LA 6 to Robeline, then on LA 1 to Belmont, via Old Jefferson Road north of Pelican) to Mansfield, following Old Jefferson Highway into town.

US 171 carried LA 1 to Shreveport, via Old Jefferson Road through Stonewall and Old Mansfield Road through Keithville. Once through Shreveport, LA 1 used US 79-US 80 (Greenwood Road) to Greenwood Road, then US 80 (Texas Avenue) across the state line toward Waskom, Texas.
All were designated by various acts of the state legislature between 1921 and 1930.  The routes were joined together under the single designation of LA 1 when the Louisiana Department of Highways renumbered the state highway system in 1955, creating a continuous route diagonally across the entire state.

Future
The Louisiana Department of Transportation and Development (DOTD) is converting LA 1 from Golden Meadow to Port Fourchon into an elevated toll expressway called the Louisiana Highway 1 Bridge. These improvements are in order to facilitate evacuations of Port Fourchon and Grand Isle in the event of a hurricane, as LA 1 in this area is vulnerable to flooding, regardless of strength of storm.

When completed, the Gateway to the Gulf Expressway will be a  elevated toll road from Golden Meadow to the Gulf of Mexico. Prior to mid-June 2012, tolls were collected using "open road tolling" technology; LA 1 was the first road or bridge in Louisiana to have tolls collected in this method. Travelers using the facilities were required to pre-pay either online, by phone, or at one of five kiosks north of the expressway, or use the "GeauxPass", an electronic toll collection transponder (or "toll tag") that collects tolls electronically. The GeauxPass is also compatible with the Crescent City Connection and all future Louisiana toll roads and the Lake Pontchartrain Causeway, but not the ferries.

Beginning in June 2012, a toll plaza was opened at the access ramp in Leeville. Vehicle drivers must now pay before accessing the expressway and the pre-pay kiosks have been removed from their respective sites. The toll plaza accepts cash or credit/debit cards. GeauxPass is still accepted. Funding for the project through taxes and grants was not available, leading to the requirement to pay for the construction via collecting tolls. By law, LA 1 toll revenues may only be utilized to repay construction loan debts for the expressway.

The first portion of this project, a two-lane toll bridge over Bayou Lafourche, opened on July 8, 2009. Tolling of the new bridge began on August 3, 2009. The two-lane section from Leeville to Port Fourchon opened on December 9, 2011. Funding is being secured for the section between Leeville and Golden Meadow with the eventual widening of the entire corridor to four lanes.

Major intersections

Special routes

Natchitoches business route

In Natchitoches, LA 1 Bus. follows the original route of LA 1 before its re-routing onto a bypass on the south and west side of town in 1975.

New Roads business route

In New Roads, LA 1 Bus. follows the original route of LA 1 through the town center before its re-routing onto the former LA 3131.  The route was bypassed in 2010 when construction of the new John James Audubon Bridge over the Mississippi River led to a realignment of highway routes in the area.

See also

LA 308, which follows the opposite bank of Bayou Lafourche south of Donaldsonville
LA 3235, a bypass between Golden Meadow and Larose

References

External links

Maps / GIS Data Homepage, Louisiana Department of Transportation and Development
Louisiana Scenic Byways Homepage
LA 1 Coalition (supports improving the southern part of LA 1)
Zachary Taylor Parkway

0001
001
Transportation in Ascension Parish, Louisiana
Transportation in Assumption Parish, Louisiana
Transportation in Avoyelles Parish, Louisiana
Transportation in Caddo Parish, Louisiana
Transportation in Iberville Parish, Louisiana
Transportation in Jefferson Parish, Louisiana
Transportation in Lafourche Parish, Louisiana
Transportation in Natchitoches Parish, Louisiana
Transportation in Pointe Coupee Parish, Louisiana
Transportation in Rapides Parish, Louisiana
Transportation in Red River Parish, Louisiana
Transportation in Shreveport, Louisiana
Transportation in West Baton Rouge Parish, Louisiana
Alexandria, Louisiana
Natchitoches, Louisiana
Thibodaux, Louisiana